"Heart Beats Slow" is a song by Australian singer songwriters Angus & Julia Stone. It was released in May 2014 as the lead single from the duo's third studio album Angus & Julia Stone. The song peaked at number 37 on the ARIA Charts.

The music video was directed by Jessie Hill and released in May 2014.

Reception
Lachlan Kanoniuk from Beat Magazine said "The new track from Angus & Julia Stone is superpowered in its insipidness, immune to criticism by virtue of commanding 100 per cent focus during listening due to its sheer un-remarkability, then by its resoundingly unmemorable nature, it's impossible to retain any knowledge of the track while putting pen to paper."

Track listing

Charts

References

2014 songs
2014 singles
Angus & Julia Stone songs
Songs written by Julia Stone
Song recordings produced by Rick Rubin